Handschin is a surname. Notable people with the surname include:

Christoph Handschin, Swiss cell biologist
Emil Handschin (1928–1990), Swiss ice hockey player
Johannes Handschin (1899–1948), Swiss artist 
Roman Handschin (born 1982), Swiss bobsledder 
Thomas Handschin (born 1973), Swiss bobsledder